Bridges Will Burn is the second released EP by British Metalcore band Rise To Remain but the first recorded on a label. It was released on 7 March 2010 through Search And Destroy Records, and was produced by Dan Weller.  The EP was released free with Issue 202 (March 2010) of British magazine Metal Hammer. The actual physical copy of the album differs from the version on iTunes. The Cd version has 4 tracks (Bridges Will Burn, Nothing Left, Purify, Illusive Existence), while the MP3 version has the same track list but with 2 extra songs. The 2 songs were taken from the band's first self-released EP Becoming One. The band's first music video was made for the song "Bridges Will Burn", and was released on 4 April 2010.

Critical reception
Ultimate Guitar Archive has praised the release of this album. They have given it 8.8 stars out of 10. They have said "The EP has amazing guitar solos, amazing fretwork, brutal drumming and of course Austin Dickinson's wide range of screams and his overall singing and the fact that nothing ever seems out of place"

Track listing

Personnel
Rise To Remain
 Austin Dickinson – lead vocals
 Pat Lundy – drums
 Ben Tovey – lead guitar
 Will Homer – rhythm guitar
 Joe Copcutt  – bass guitar
Production
Produced by Dan Weller

References

2010 EPs
Metalcore EPs
Rise to Remain albums
Albums produced by Dan Weller